Röthen (in Bavaria: Röden) is a river of Thuringia and Bavaria, Germany. It passes through Sonneberg and Neustadt bei Coburg, and flows into the Itz near Rödental.

See also
List of rivers of Thuringia
List of rivers of Bavaria

Geographical Area
The Röthen climbs nearby the Wiefelsburg, just one between Steinach and also hammers located Einödgehöft. By the origin on the southern shore of this Thuringian Slate Mountains at the Sonneberg shore, the Röthen escapes throughout the Röthengrund into the south-west through the town of Sonneberg and round the boundary to Upper Franconia. While keeping up the itzgründischen pronunciation" Rüed'n'" at Upper Franconia the state spelling changes into Röden. The Röden leaks throughout Neustadt and Rödental. It flows into the Itz at Rödental.

References

Rivers of Thuringia
Rivers of Bavaria
Rivers of Germany